8th National Board of Review Awards
December 18, 1936
The 8th National Board of Review Awards were announced on 18 December 1936.

Best American Films
Mr. Deeds Goes to Town
The Story of Louis Pasteur
Modern Times
Fury
Winterset
The Devil Is a Sissy
Ceiling Zero
Romeo and Juliet
The Prisoner of Shark Island
The Green Pastures

Top Foreign Films 
Carnival in Flanders
The New Earth
Rembrandt
The Ghost Goes West
Nine Days a Queen
We Are from Kronstadt
Son of Mongolia
The Yellow Cruise
Les Misérables
Secret Agent

Winners
Best American Film: Mr. Deeds Goes to Town
Best Foreign Film: La kermesse héroïque (Carnival in Flanders), France

External links
National Board of Review of Motion Pictures :: Awards for 1936

1936
1936 film awards
1936 in American cinema